B88 may refer to :
 Sicilian Defence, Scheveningen Variation, according to the list of chess openings
 Bundesstraße 88, a German road
 Kleinkirchheimer Straße, an Austrian road

B-88 may refer to :
 B-88 (Michigan county highway)
 Blackburn B-88, a prototype carrier-borne Anti-submarine warfare aircraft